This is a list of notable events in country music that took place in the year 1926.

Events

Top Hillbilly (Country) Recordings

The following songs were extracted from records included in Joel Whitburn's Pop Memories 1890-1954, record sales reported on the "Discography of American Historical Recordings" website, and other sources as specified. Numerical rankings are approximate, they are only used as a frame of reference.

Births 
 January 2 – Harold Bradley, session guitarist. (died 2019).
 January 12 – Ray Price, "The Cherokee Cowboy," multi-faceted country performer from the 1950s onward (died 2013).
 December 21 – Freddie Hart, best known for his string of early to mid-1970s hits, including "Easy Loving" (died 2018).

Deaths

References

Further reading 
 Kingsbury, Paul, "Vinyl Hayride: Country Music Album Covers 1947–1989," Country Music Foundation, 2003
 Millard, Bob, "Country Music: 70 Years of America's Favorite Music," HarperCollins, New York, 1993
 Whitburn, Joel. "Top Country Songs 1944–2005 – 6th Edition." 2005.

Country
Country music by year